Daniil Igorevich Makeyev (born 30 July 1998) is a Russian football player.

Club career
He made his debut in the Russian Football National League for FC Zenit-2 Saint Petersburg on 11 March 2019 in a game against FC Spartak-2 Moscow.

References

External links
 
 Profile by Russian Football National League
 

1998 births
Footballers from Moscow
Living people
Russian footballers
Association football midfielders
Association football forwards
FC Rubin Kazan players
FC Zenit-2 Saint Petersburg players
FK Dainava Alytus players
Russian First League players
Russian Second League players
A Lyga players
Russian expatriate footballers
Expatriate footballers in Lithuania